Saddleworth School is a community, secondary school in Diggle, England, for students in years 7-11.

History 

In July 2020, the construction of Saddleworth School began at the former site of W.H. Shaw Pallet Works in Diggle at a cost of £27 million. In March 2022, the school moved to the new site in Diggle.

In September 2020, the school gained local attention following an incident in which a 13-year-old student's face was cut in a fight, leaving her with scarring.

Notable alumni 
 Mike Ford, rugby union coach and former professional rugby league footballer
 Victoria Bateman (née Powell), feminist economist and academic
 Kyle Hogg, former Lancashire and England cricketer

Notable staff 
 Phil Larder, former Head of Physical Education

References

External links 
 

Community schools in the Metropolitan Borough of Oldham
Saddleworth
Secondary schools in the Metropolitan Borough of Oldham